Shayne Stead is an Australian former professional rugby league footballer who played for the Penrith Panthers.

Stead, a local junior, played first-grade for Penrith in the 1989 NSWRL season. On his first-grade debut against Manly at Brookvale, he scored a try and kicked five goals for Penrith, as a replacement fullback for the injured Neil Baker.

In 1991 he joined South Sydney, but didn't make it into their first-grade side.

References

External links
Shayne Stead at Rugby League project

Year of birth missing (living people)
Living people
Australian rugby league players
Penrith Panthers players
Rugby league fullbacks